The Gardiner Dam on the South Saskatchewan River in Saskatchewan is the third largest embankment dam in Canada and one of the largest embankment dams in the world. Construction on Gardiner Dam and the smaller Qu'Appelle River Dam was started in 1959 and completed in 1967, creating Lake Diefenbaker upstream and diverting a considerable portion of the South Saskatchewan's flow into the Qu'Appelle River. The dam is owned and operated by the Saskatchewan Water Security Agency.

Two main gravity fed aqueducts (canals) from the lake were built in 1967 as part of the South Saskatchewan River Project to supply water to downstream reservoirs for irrigation, drinking water, and industrial uses. The Westside Irrigation Project supplies water to the west side of the South Saskatchewan River and the Eastside Irrigation Project supplies water to the east side of the South Saskatchewan River. Notable reservoirs on the Eastside Irrigation Project include Broderick Reservoir, Brightwater Reservoir, Blackstrap Lake, Bradwell Reservoir, and Zelma Reservoir. On July 2, 2020, Premier Scott Moe announced a 10-year, $4 billion irrigation expansion project that would increase the amount of land irrigated from Lake Diefenbaker to up to 500,000 acres. Phase one and two of the project will rehabilitate and expand the existing Westside Irrigation canal system. Phase three will see a system built south from the Qu'Appelle River Dam called the Qu’Appelle South Irrigation Project.

Danielson Provincial Park has property on both sides of the dam. On the north-east end is the RV park and on the south-west end is a beach, restaurant, and guided tours of the Coteau Creek Hydroelectric Station. The park was named after Gustaf Herman Danielson (former Saskatchewan Liberal Party MLA).

An integrated power generating plant, SaskPower's Coteau Creek Hydroelectric Station, produces a net 186 MW of electricity from three 62 MW generators. Highway 44 crosses the river atop the dam.

The dam is named for a former Premier of Saskatchewan and longtime federal cabinet minister, James G. Gardiner.

See also 
List of dams and reservoirs in Canada

References

External links 
Danielson Provincial Park

Coteau No. 255, Saskatchewan
Dams in Saskatchewan
Loreburn No. 254, Saskatchewan
Dams completed in 1967
Dams in the Saskatchewan River basin
South Saskatchewan River